Trade River is an unincorporated community in the town of Anderson in southwestern Burnett County, in northwestern Wisconsin, United States. The community consists of a church and a few residences.

Notes

Sources
Two books produced by a local historical society give the history of the Trade River Valley. The two books have been made fully readable online by the authors.  
Stories of The Trade River Valley
The Second Book of the Trade River Valley

Unincorporated communities in Burnett County, Wisconsin
Unincorporated communities in Wisconsin